Joseph Pinion III (born August 11, 1983) is an American former television host and political candidate. He was the nominee of the Republican and Conservative parties in the 2022 United States Senate election in New York, making him the first African American to receive a major party's backing for the U.S. Senate in the State of New York.

Early life and education 
Pinion was born in Bronxville. He attended Colgate University on an athletic grant, playing football.

Career 
Pinion was a youth development director at a Bronx health center for some time. He later became a political commentator and appeared on news networks such as CNN. He eventually became the host of "Saturday Agenda" on the channel Newsmax. He is also involved in climate change advocacy, working with the organization RepublicEn, a right-leaning environmentalist advocacy organization.

Politics 

Prior to running for office, Pinion served as Chair of the Conservative Color Coalition and was the Outreach Director for the New York Young Republican Federation.

In 2018, Pinion announced his candidacy for New York's 90th assembly district, which was vacated after Shelley Mayer won an open seat to the state senate. He received the Republican and Conservative party nominations, but lost the election to Nader Sayegh.

In 2022, on Martin Luther King Jr. Day, Pinion announced that he was running for the United States Senate in a video highlighting Martin Luther King Jr. At the Republican convention in Nassau County, he received the party designation. He unsuccessfully challenged Democratic incumbent Chuck Schumer, the Senate Majority Leader. 

Pinion ultimately received 2.5 million votes statewide, winning 42.8% of the vote to Schumer's 56.8%. Despite a significant funding disparity (Pinion spent only $500,000 on campaign advertising, against Schumer's $38 million), Pinion performed better than any Republican candidate has in a New York US Senate race since Rick Lazio in 2000, and lost to Schumer by a narrower margin than any Republican candidate has since Schumer beat Senator Al D'Amato in 1998. Pinion's performance was part of a "red wave" in the 2022 New York state elections, which saw Republicans overperform in statewide and Congressional races.

References

External links 

Living people
Black conservatism in the United States
Colgate University alumni
21st-century American politicians
21st-century African-American politicians
1983 births
New York (state) Republicans
People from Yonkers, New York
Candidates in the 2022 United States Senate elections